Manchester Thunder are an English netball team based in Manchester. Their senior team plays in the Netball Superleague. In 2005–06, Thunder were founding members of the league. They were Superleague champions in 2012, 2014, 2019 and 2022. Between 2001 and 2012 they played as Northern Thunder and were originally based in Bury, Greater Manchester.

History

Northern Thunder
Between 2001 and 2005 Northern Thunder, together with five other franchises – Northern Flames, London Tornadoes, London Hurricanes, University of Birmingham Blaze and Team Bath Force – competed in the Super Cup. Northern Thunder won the 2002 Super Cup. Northern Thunder players from the Super Cup era included Amanda Newton, Tracey Neville, Jade Clarke and Sara Bayman

In 2005 Northern Thunder were named as the North West England franchise in the new Netball Superleague. Together with Brunel Hurricanes, Celtic Dragons, Leeds Carnegie, Galleria Mavericks, Team Bath, Loughborough Lightning and Team Northumbria, Northern Thunder were founding members of the league. In 2012, Thunder won their first Superleague title. Janelle Lawson scored 33 goals as they defeated Surrey Storm 57–55 in the grand final.

Manchester Thunder
In 2012 Thunder relocated from Bury, Greater Manchester to Gorton. They subsequently changed their name from Northern Thunder to Manchester Thunder ahead of the 2013 season. In 2014 Thunder won their second Superleague title after defeating Surrey Storm 49–48 in the grand final. In 2019 Thunder won their third Superleague title.

In the 2022 season Manchester Thunder finished the regular season undefeated, becoming the first team to do so over 20 games. They defeated Team Bath in the semi-finals and then beat Loughborough Lightning in the final to claim their 4th Superleague title.

Senior finals

Super Cup

Netball Superleague Grand Finals

Mike Greenwood Trophy
Since 2012 Manchester Thunder have hosted the Manchester Invitational Tournament. The winners are awarded the Mike Greenwood Trophy, named in honour of the former Northern Thunder  head coach who died in 2011. It is usually played during pre-season.

Home venues
Thunder train and play their home games at several venues and locations throughout Greater Manchester, Lancashire and Cheshire. Between 2008–09 and 2011, Northern Thunder played their home Superleague games at Castle Leisure Centre in Bury, Greater Manchester. In 2012 Manchester Thunder began playing their home Superleague games at Wright Robinson College in Gorton. When Manchester Thunder played home games there, the arena was referred to as the Manchester Thunderdome. They have also played home Netball Superleague matches at Manchester Arena. In 2020 Manchester Thunder will play their home Superleague games at the National Basketball Performance Centre in the Belle Vue Sports Village.

Notable players

2023 squad

Internationals

 Erin Bell

 Joyce Mvula

 Liana Leota
 Anna Thompson

 Caroline O'Hanlon

 Shadine van der Merwe

Head coaches

Honours
Netball Superleague
Winners: 2012, 2014, 2019, 2022: 4
Runners up: 2016: 1
Super Cup
Winners: 2002: 1
Runners up: 2004: 1
Mike Greenwood Trophy
Winners: 2012, 2013, 2014, 2018, 2019: 5
Runners up: 2015: 1

References

External links
 Manchester Thunder on Facebook
  Manchester Thunder on Twitter

 
Netball teams in England
Netball Superleague teams
Sport in Manchester
Sports clubs established in 2001
2001 establishments in England